Nightmare Factory may refer to:
 The Nightmare Factory, a comic book
 The Nightmare Factory: Volume 2, a comic book
 Nightmare Factory (film), a television documentary
 The Nightmare Factory, the name of All Elite Wrestling's de facto professional wrestling training facility